The Mercedes-AMG G 63 6×6 or Mercedes-Benz G 63 AMG 6×6 is a SUT manufactured by Mercedes-Benz. An SUT derivative of the six wheel drive Mercedes Geländewagen developed for the Australian Army from 2007 (see Mercedes-Benz G-Class#Military operators), at the time it was the company's largest and second most expensive street-legal offroad vehicle. It was manufactured from 2013 to 2015 by Magna Steyr in Graz, Austria.

Overview
It combines the engine from the G63, a twin-turbo V-8, with 6x6 portal axles, a pick-up version of the G-Class body, and a luxury interior. It was produced from 2013 to 2015, with production exceeding 100 vehicles.

The G63 AMG 6×6 features six-wheel drive running on 5.5L, 536-hp, 561-lb-ft twin-turbo DOHC 32-valve V-8 AMG engine. The G63 AMG 6×6 is fitted with Mercedes' 7G-tronic seven-speed automatic transmission; its transfer case can alter between a 0.87:1 high-range ratio for on-road driving and 2.16:1 low-range ratio for off-road conditions to all six wheels in a nominal 30:40:30 split. An extra shaft delivers power to the rearmost axle. The vehicle has five electronic differential locks, which can deliver 100% lockup of all six wheels, operated by three switches on the dashboard.

It has portal axles, similar to those fitted on Unimog vehicles. The vehicle is installed with  beadlock wheels and  tires, has a  wheelbase (front axle to rearmost axle) and weighs .

The G63 AMG 6x6 features a compressor which allows it to reduce or increase tyre pressure in order to adapt the traction to the driving surface, especially in desertlike environments. Therefore, the compressor fills four containers with 20 litres each to allow fast inflation of the tyres. This makes it possible to change from sandy deserts to regular streets in less than twenty seconds.

The G63 AMG 6×6 was launched in early 2013. The company decided to stop sales of the car and declared the model completely sold out in early 2015 to maintain the model's exclusivity. Mercedes-Benz managed to sell more units of the G63 AMG 6×6 than originally anticipated. The last customer delivery of the G63 AMG 6×6 left the G-Class factory in Graz, Austria in May 2015.

In 2015, Mercedes-Benz introduced a limited 15 units RHD version of Brabus 6×6 for the Malaysian market; they are the only RHD version of 6×6 units in the world. They are only available for the Malaysian market and were bought by Naza World, one of the largest automotive conglomerates company in Malaysia. They come with a price tag of RM3,214,119 (698,888 euros).

A wealthy South African businessman wanted to purchase a 6x6, but Brabus was only willing to fulfil the request to convert it to right hand drive if he had a larger order. Subsequently, he ordered 10, which were converted to RHD and brought into South Africa.

In popular culture
The vehicle appears in the 2014 movie Beyond the Reach and is also featured in the 2015 film Jurassic World and also Grand Theft Auto V also called Dubsta 6x6. The G63 6x6 also appears in Forza Horizon 4 since update 11, which can be awarded by completing Tier 7 in the Top Gear Special Horizon Story. and returned in Forza Horizon 5.

See also
Mercedes-Benz W31 
Mercedes-AMG G65 (G-Class AMG version (4x4 regular axle))
Mercedes-Benz G500 4×4² (Later MB model also with portal axles)

References

External links
 
 $615,000 Mercedes-Benz G63 AMG 6x6 is rolling, rocking, and rumbling its way through New York!

G63
Mercedes-Benz G-Class
Sport utility trucks
Luxury sport utility vehicles
Full-size sport utility vehicles
Expanded length sport utility vehicles
Off-road vehicles
Six-wheeled vehicles
Six-wheel drive
All-wheel-drive vehicles
Cars of Austria
Cars introduced in 2013